Maria Theresia von Paradis (May 15, 1759 – February 1, 1824) was an Austrian musician and composer who lost her sight at an early age, and for whom her close friend Mozart may have written his Piano Concerto No. 18 in B-flat major. She was also in contact with Salieri, Haydn, and Gluck.

Early life 
Maria Theresia von Paradis was the daughter of Joseph Anton von Paradis, Imperial Secretary of Commerce and Court Councilor to the Empress Maria Theresa, for whom she was named. The Empress, however, was not her godmother, as was often believed. Between the ages of 2 and 5 she lost her eyesight.

She received a broad education in the musical arts from:

  (music theory and composition)
 Leopold Kozeluch (piano)
 Vincenzo Righini (singing)
 Antonio Salieri (singing and composition)
 Abbé Vogler (music theory and composition).

By all accounts, Paradis had an excellent memory and exceptionally accurate hearing, as she was widely reported to have learned over sixty concertos by heart, as well as a large repertoire of solo and religious works.

In 1773 she was commissioned to perform an organ concerto by Antonio Salieri which survives but without its second movement.

By 1775, Paradis was performing as a singer and pianist in various Viennese salons and concerts.

Paradis was treated from late 1776 until the middle of 1777 by the famous Franz Anton Mesmer, who was able to improve on her blindness temporarily until she was removed from his care, amid concerns on the one hand of possible scandal, on the other hand at the potential loss of her disability pension. In any case, on her departure from Dr. Mesmer the blindness came back permanently.

Touring Europe 
Paradis did not stay confined to Vienna. In 1783, she set out on an extended tour towards Paris and London, accompanied by her mother and librettist Johann Riedinger who invented a composition board for her. In August of that year they visited the Mozarts in Salzburg, though Nannerl's diary seems to place this meeting in September. She played in Frankfurt and other German cities, then Switzerland. Paradis finally reached Paris in March 1784. Her first concert there was given in April at the Concert Spirituel; the review in the Journal de Paris for it remarked: "…one must have heard her to form an idea of the touch, the precision, the fluency and vividness of her playing." In all she made a total of 14 appearances in Paris, to excellent reviews and acclaim. She also assisted in helping Valentin Haüy ("the father and apostle of the blind") establish the first school for the blind, which opened in 1785.

Paradis performed a piano concerto by Joseph Haydn (HXVIII: 4), which may have premiered in Paris also in 1784, but it appears to have been composed in the 1770s, and the original manuscript is now lost.

Also in 1784 Paradis performed a piano concerto (probably No. 18, K.456) by Mozart. While K.456 is believed to be the concerto intended for Paradis, there are continuing doubts concerning this. Ruth Halliwell comments:

Paradis traveled to Westminster in late 1784 and performed over the next few months at court, Carlton House (the town house of the Prince of Wales), and in the Professional Concerts at Hanover Square, Westminster, among other places. She played Handel fugues to George III and later accompanied the Prince of Wales, a cellist. However, her concerts were less well received and attended in England than in Paris. She continued to tour in Western Europe (including Hamburg where she met Carl Philipp Emanuel Bach), and after passing through Berlin and Prague, ended up back in Vienna in 1786. Further plans were made for her to give concerts in the Italian states and Russia, but nothing came of these. She returned to Prague in 1797 for the production of her opera Rinaldo und Alcina.

Compositions and later life 
During her tour of Europe, Paradis began composing solo music for piano as well as pieces for voice and keyboard. The earliest music attributed to her is often cited as a set of four piano sonatas from about 1777, but these are really by Pietro Domenico Paradisi, to whom much of her music is often mistakenly attributed. Her earliest major work in existence is the collection Zwölf Lieder auf ihrer Reise in Musik gesetzt, composed between 1784 and 1786.

By the year 1789, Paradis was spending more time with composition than performance, as shown by the fact that from 1789 to 1797 she composed five operas and three cantatas. After the failure of the opera Rinaldo und Alcina from 1797, she shifted her energy more and more to teaching. In 1808, she founded her own music school in Vienna, where she taught singing, piano and theory to young girls. A Sunday concert series at this school featured the work of her outstanding pupils. She continued to teach up until her death in 1824.

When composing, she used a composition board invented by Riedinger, her partner and librettist, and for correspondence the hand-printing machine invented by Wolfgang von Kempelen. Her songs are mostly representative of the operatic style, which displays coloratura and trills. Salieri's influence may be seen in the dramatically composed scenes. Much of the stage work is modeled on the Viennese Singspiel style, while her piano works show a great influence by her teacher Leopold Kozeluch.

Sicilienne 

The most famous composition ascribed to Paradis, the Sicilienne in E-flat major for violin and piano (played at Prince Harry's and Meghan Markle's wedding) is a musical hoax by a 20th Century violinist Samuel Dushkin. The Sicilienne is based on the Larghetto movement from Carl Maria von Weber's Violin Sonata in F major, Op. 10, No.1.

List of works by Maria Theresa Paradis 

Stage works

 Ariadne und Bacchus, melodrama, June 20, 1791 (lost)
 Der Schulkandidat, December 5, 1792, pt of Act 2 and all of Act 3 (Overture: ClarNan Editions; rest lost)
 Rinaldo und Alcina, Zauberoper, June 30, 1797 (lost)
 Große militärische Oper 1805 (lost)
 Zwei ländliche Opern (lost)

Cantatas

 Trauerkantate auf den Tod Leopolds II, 1792 (lost)
 Deutsches Monument Ludwigs des Unglücklichen, 1793
 Kantate auf die Wiedergenesung meines Vaters (lost)

Instrumental works

 Pianoforte Concerto in G (lost)
 Pianoforte Concerto in C (lost)
 12 Piano Sonatas, 1792 (lost)
 Pianoforte Trio, 1800 (lost)
 Fantasie in G, pf, 1807
 Fantasie in C, pf, 1811
 Keyboard Variations (lost)
 An meine entfernten Lieben, pf (lost)
 Various songs and lieder totaling at least 18 works, of which two are lost.

Scores

Cultural references

Novels and short stories 

 Barnes, Julian. "Harmony" in Pulse, a collection of short stories by Julian Barnes. New York: Alfred A. Knopf, 2011.
 Halberstadt, Michèle. The Pianist in the Dark [Novel]. New York, Pegasus Books, 2011.
 O'Doherty, Brian. The Strange Case of Mademoiselle P.[Novel]. Vintage, London 1992, .
 Walser, Alissa. Mesmerized [Novel]. London: MacLehose Press, 2012.
 Thuillier, Jean, "Franz Anton Mesmer ou L'extase Magnétique" [Biography/Novel]. Paris, Robert Laffont 1988.

Play 
 Stevens, Claudia. Playing Paradis 1994.
Video documentation, script, musical sketches and performance history, available in the Claudia Stevens papers, Special Collections, Earl Gregg Swem Library, College of William and Mary. http://scdb.swem.wm.edu/?p=collections/controlcard&id=8096
A musically self-accompanied solo play in two acts, text and music by Claudia Stevens, concerns Maria Theresia's relation to Mesmer, and blindness as metaphor.

Films 
 Forman, Miloš, dir. Amadeus Warner Brothers, 2002.
Paradis is mentioned in a scene during which Antonio Salieri reports to Emperor Joseph II Paradis's claim that she was molested by Mozart during a lesson. This claim, in the film's context, is ultimately portrayed as a ruse by Salieri to hinder Mozart's appointment to a court position as teacher to the Emperor's young niece.
 Spottiswoode, Roger. Mesmer. Image Entertainment, 2000.
Mademoiselle Paradis by Barbara Albert, a participant in the 2018 Cleveland International Film Festival, more info at mademoiselle-paradis.com

See also 
 Charlotta Seuerling

References

External links

 Free digital scores by Maria Theresia von Paradis in the OpenScore Lieder Corpus

Bibliography

Adler, Guido, and Karl Friberth. Das Wiener Lied von 1778 bis Mozarts Tod. Score Anthology. Denkmäler der Tonkunst in Österreich 54, 1960.
Angermüller, Rudolph. Antonio Salieri. Dokumente seines Lebens. 3 Bde. Bock, Bad Honnef, 2002.
Borroff, Edith. "Women Composers: Reminiscence and History." College Music Symposium 15 (1975): 26–33.
Bundes-Blindenerziehungsinstitut. 200 Jahre Blindenbildung im deutschen Sprachraum. Wien 2004, S. 56.
Frankl, Ludwig August. Maria Theresia von Paradis' Biographie. Linz: Verlag des oberoesterreichischen Privat-Blinden- Institutes, 1876.
Fürst, Marion. Maria Theresia Paradis, Köln: Böhlau 2005, Mozart-Jahrbuch 2007/2008, (Kassel: Bärenreiter, 2011) Archived review online
Fürst, Marion. Maria Theresia Paradis – Mozarts berühmte Zeitgenossin. Böhlau, Köln, 2005.
Gordy, Laura Ann. "Women Creating Music, 1750–1850: Marianne Martinez, Maria Theresia von Paradis, Fanny Mendelssohn Hensel, and Clara Wieck Schumann." D.M.A. thesis, University of Alabama, 1987.
Halliwell, Ruth. The Mozart Family: Four Lives in a Social Context. Clarendon Press, Oxford, 1998.
Jezic, Diane, and Elizabeth Wood. Women Composer: The Lost Tradition Found. New York: The Feminist Press at the City University of New York.
Matsushita, Hidemi. "The Musical Career and Compositions of Maria Theresia von Paradis." Ph.D. dissertation, Brigham Young University, 1989.
Maxwell, Andrea. "Maria Theresia von Paradis." Helicon Nine 1, no. 2 (Fall-Winter 1979): 54–57.
McCann, Michelle Roehm, and Amelie Welden. Girls Who Rocked the World: Heroines from Joan of Arc to Mother Teresa. New York: Aladdin, 2012.
Mell, Alexander. Encyklopädisches Handbuch des Blindenwesens Verlag von A. Pichlers Witwe und Sohn, Wien, Leipzig, 1900, S. 576–578.
Nicholas, Jeremy. "The Forgotten Artists." International Piano #16 (Nov–Dec 2012): 36–39.
Purtscher, Nora. Doctor Mesmer: An Historical Study. London: Westhouse, 1947.
Sadie, Stanley, ed.The New Grove Dictionary of Music and Musicians. (2. Auflage) Grove Dictionaries, New York, 2000.
Schleifer, Martha Furman, and Sylvia Glickman. Women Composers: Music through the Ages. Score Anthology. New York: G. K. Hall, 1996–.

1759 births
1824 deaths
18th-century Austrian musicians
19th-century Austrian musicians
19th-century women musicians
Austrian composers
Austrian women composers
Blind classical musicians